The Birdcage is a 1996 American comedy film directed by Mike Nichols, adapted by Elaine May, and starring Robin Williams, Gene Hackman, Nathan Lane, and Dianne Wiest. Dan Futterman, Calista Flockhart, Hank Azaria, and Christine Baranski appear in supporting roles. It is an English-language remake of the 1978 Franco-Italian film La Cage aux Folles and the musical of the same name.

Plot
Armand Goldman is the openly gay owner of a drag club in South Beach called The Birdcage; his life partner Albert, an effeminate and flamboyant man, plays Starina, the star attraction of the club. They live together in an apartment above The Birdcage with Agador, their openly gay flamboyant Guatemalan housekeeper who aspires to be in Armand's drag show.

One day, Armand's son Val, who resulted from Armand's drunken one-night stand with a woman named Katharine, comes home to announce that he has been seeing a young woman named Barbara whom he intends to marry. Although unhappy about the news, Armand agrees to support Val. Unfortunately, Barbara's parents are the ultra-conservative Republican Senator Kevin Keeley and his wife Louise.

Kevin, co-founder of a conservative group called the Coalition for Moral Order, becomes embroiled in a political scandal when the group's co-founder and Kevin's fellow senator is found dead in the bed of an underage black prostitute. Louise and Barbara convince Kevin that a visit to meet the family of his daughter's fiancé would be the perfect way to stave off bad press, so they set out for South Beach.

Barbara shares news of her father's plan to Val; to cover the Goldmans' truth, she has told her parents that Armand is straight and a cultural attaché to Greece. Armand dislikes the idea of being forced into the closet, but agrees to play along, enlisting the help of friends and club employees to redecorate the family's apartment to more closely resemble a traditional household. Val and Armand attempt to get Albert out of the house, but when they fail, Albert suggests that he will pose as Val's straight uncle. Armand contacts Katharine and explains the situation; she promises to come to the party and pretend to be his wife. Armand then tries to coach Albert on how to be straight, but Albert's flamboyant nature makes the task difficult. Armand realizes his plan will not fool anyone, and Albert takes offense and locks himself in his room.

The Keeleys arrive at the Goldmans' (who are calling themselves "Coleman" for the evening to hide their Jewish heritage) redecorated apartment; they are greeted by Agador, who is attempting to pass as a Greek butler named Spartacus for the night. Unfortunately, Katharine gets caught in traffic, and the Keeleys begin wondering where "Mrs. Coleman" is. Suddenly, Albert enters, dressed and styled as a conservative middle-aged woman. Armand, Val, and Barbara are nervous, but Kevin and Louise are taken in by the disguise.

Despite the success of the evening, trouble begins when the senator's chauffeur betrays him to two tabloid journalists, Harry Radman and his photographer, who have been hoping for a scoop on the Coalition story and who have followed the Keeleys to South Beach. While they research The Birdcage, they also remove a note that Armand has left on the door informing Katharine not to come upstairs. When she arrives, she unknowingly reveals the deceptions, leading Val to confess to the scheme and finally identify Armand as his true parent.

Kevin is initially confused by the situation, but Louise informs him of the truth and scolds him for being more concerned with his career than his family's happiness. When attempting to leave, he is ambushed by the paparazzi camped outside to take his picture. Albert then realizes that there is a way for the family to escape without being recognized. He dresses them in drag and they use the apartment's back entrance to sneak into The Birdcage where, by dancing to "We Are Family," they make their way out of the nightclub without incident. Barbara and Val are married in an interfaith service that both families attend.

Cast
 Robin Williams as Armand Goldman
 Gene Hackman as Senator Kevin Keeley
 Nathan Lane as Albert Goldman
 Dianne Wiest as Louise Keeley
 Dan Futterman as Val Goldman
 Calista Flockhart as Barbara Keeley
 Hank Azaria as Agador Spartacus
 Christine Baranski as Katharine Archer, Val's biological mother
 Tom McGowan as Harry Radman
 Grant Heslov as National Enquirer photographer

Soundtrack
Three songs written by Stephen Sondheim were adapted and arranged for the film by composer Jonathan Tunick. Albert's first song (as Starina) is "Can That Boy Foxtrot," cut from Sondheim's Follies. "Little Dream" was written specifically for the film, ultimately used during Albert's rehearsal with the gum-chewing dancer. While Armand and Katharine dance in her office, they sing "Love Is in the Air", cut from A Funny Thing Happened on the Way to the Forum. In addition to the Sondheim songs, Tunick utilized dance-style music such as Donna Summer's "She Works Hard for the Money" and "We Are Family," along with Gloria Estefan and Miami Sound Machine's "Conga."

Reception
The film opened on March 8, 1996, and grossed $18,275,828 in its opening weekend, topping the box office. It remained at No. 1 for the next three weeks before being derailed by the openings of Primal Fear and A Thin Line Between Love and Hate. By the end of its 14-week run, the film had grossed $124,060,553 domestically and $61,200,000 internationally, eventually reaching a total of US$185,260,553 worldwide.

The film received positive reviews upon its release. On the review aggregation website Rotten Tomatoes, the film holds an 83% approval rating based on reviews from 58 critics. The site's critical consensus reads, "Mike Nichols wrangles agreeably amusing performances from Robin Williams and Nathan Lane in this fun, if not quite essential, remake of the French-Italian comedy La Cage aux Folles." On Metacritic the film has a score of 72/100 based on reviews from 18 critics, indicating "generally favorable reviews."

James Berardinelli wrote in ReelViews, "The film is so boisterously entertaining that it's easy for the unsuspecting viewer not to realize that there's a message here." Desson Thomson of The Washington Post described the film as "A spirited remake of the French drag farce [that] has everything in place, from eyeliner to one-liner." Owen Gleiberman of Entertainment Weekly called the film "Enchantingly witty." Janet Maslin of The New York Times gave the film a positive review, especially praising Robin Williams' performance: "...this is one of his most cohesive and least antic performances. It's also a mischievously funny one: He does a fine job of integrating gag lines with semi-serious acting..."

The Gay & Lesbian Alliance Against Defamation (GLAAD) praised the film for "going beyond the stereotypes to see the characters' depth and humanity. The film celebrates differences and points out the outrageousness of hiding those differences." The film was also nominated for a GLAAD Media Award.

Accolades

See also
 Cross-dressing in film and television
 List of lesbian, gay, bisexual, or transgender-related films by storyline

References

External links

 
 
 
 
 

1996 comedy films
1996 films
1996 LGBT-related films
American comedy films
American films based on plays
American LGBT-related films
American remakes of French films
American remakes of Italian films
Cross-dressing in American films
Drag (clothing)-related films
Films about anti-LGBT sentiment
Films about weddings
Films based on adaptations
Films directed by Mike Nichols
Films set in Miami
Films shot in Miami
Films with screenplays by Elaine May
Gay-related films
Homophobia in fiction
LGBT-related comedy films
United Artists films
1990s English-language films
1990s American films